The 1996 Masters (officially the 1996 Benson & Hedges Masters) was a professional non-ranking snooker tournament that took place between 4 and 11 February 1996 at the Wembley Conference Centre in London, England. The last 16 and quarter-final rounds were extended from 9 to 11 frames while the final was extended from 17 to 19 frames, which has remained the match format ever since.

Stephen Hendry won his sixth Masters title by defeating defending champion Ronnie O'Sullivan 10–5 in the final. Hendry won £125,000 and £10,000 for the highest break of the tournament (144). During his quarter-final match Hendry also set the record of scoring 487 points without reply against Jimmy White.

Field
Defending champion Ronnie O'Sullivan was the number 1 seed with World Champion Stephen Hendry seeded 2. Places were allocated to the top 16 players in the world rankings. Players seeded 15 and 16 played in the wild-card round against the winner of the qualifying event, Matthew Stevens (ranked 236), and Andy Hicks (ranked 17), who was the wild-card selection. Dave Harold, Andy Hicks and Matthew Stevens were making their debuts in the Masters.

Wild-card round
In the preliminary round, the qualifier and wild-card players played the 15th and 16th seeds:

Main draw

Final

Qualifying
Matthew Stevens won the qualifying tournament, known as the 1995 Benson & Hedges Championship at the time.

Century breaks 
Total: 21
 144, 134, 127, 125, 121, 105  Stephen Hendry
 131, 100  Alan McManus
 128, 109, 109, 106  Ronnie O'Sullivan
 125, 118, 103, 102  Andy Hicks
 117  John Parrott
 110  Nigel Bond
 104  Steve Davis
 101  John Higgins
 100  Dave Harold

Andy Hicks's 125, 103 and 102 were scored in the wild-card round.

References

Masters (snooker)
Masters Snooker
Masters Snooker
February 1996 sports events in the United Kingdom